The 1817 New York gubernatorial election was held in April/May 1817 to elect the Governor and Lieutenant Governor of New York.

History
Governor Daniel D. Tompkins was elected Vice President of the United States in November 1816; he resigned in February 1817. Article XVII of the New York State Constitution of 1777 said that "...as often as the seat of government shall become vacant, a wise and descreet freeholder of this State shall be, by ballot, elected governor,...,which elections shall be always held at the times and places of choosing representatives in assembly..." This meant that, whenever a vacancy occurred, the Lieutenant Governor did not succeed to the governor's office but administrated the state only until the end of the yearly term of the New York State Assembly on June 30, the successor being elected in April.

Candidates
The Democratic-Republican Party nominated former Lieutenant Governor DeWitt Clinton. They nominated acting Governor John Tayler for Lieutenant Governor.

Though he did not run, the Tammany organization, which opposed Clinton, distributed ballots in New York City with the name of former Secretary of State of New York Peter Buell Porter, and a few were cast.

Results
The Democratic-Republican ticket of Clinton and Tayler was elected.

Notes

Sources
Result: The Tribune Almanac 1841

See also
New York gubernatorial elections
New York state elections

1817
New York
Gubernatorial election
April 1817 events
May 1817 events